Sams Valley is an unincorporated community in Jackson County, Oregon, United States. It lies along Oregon Route 234 northeast of Gold Hill, in the Medford area.

Originally named "Moonville", the community takes its name from a valley that was named after Chief Sam of the Rogue River tribe of Native Americans. Sams Valley had its own post office from 1873 until 1953. Today, the communities of Beagle, Antioch, and Table Rock are all considered part of Sams Valley.

References

Populated places established in 1873
Unincorporated communities in Jackson County, Oregon
1873 establishments in Oregon
Unincorporated communities in Oregon